The Chung Wah Cemetery, also known as China Mission-Chung Wah Chinese Cemetery, in Folsom, California is a cemetery from 1906.

The city of Folsom had a thriving Chinese community of about 3,000 that was drawn by the gold mining in the area. The size and shape of the cemetery suggests that it was not planned well. Graves were reportedly dug wherever there was room, with no specific orientation or layout. The Chung Wah cemetery served Chinese immigrants of the Heungshan dialect while another local cemetery, Yeong Wo was built by people from the Chungshan district. It was listed on the National Register of Historic Places in 1995.

References

External links
 China Mission-Chung Wah Chinese Cemetery
 
 

1906 establishments in California
Cemeteries on the National Register of Historic Places in California
Chinese-American history
Chinese cemeteries
Chinese-American culture in California
Buildings and structures in Sacramento County, California
History of Sacramento County, California
Folsom, California
National Register of Historic Places in Sacramento County, California
Cemeteries in Sacramento County, California